The Vancouver version of the UWA Heavyweight Championship was the top singles title in All Star Wrestling from its establishment sometime after All Star disaffiliated from the National Wrestling Alliance in late-1985 until the promotion closed in 1989.

Title history

See also

Professional wrestling in Canada

External links
UWA Heavyweight title history (Vancouver)
Vance Nevada's Canadian Wrestling Results Archive (Western Canada 1985-1989)

Heavyweight wrestling championships
Professional wrestling in British Columbia